This is a list of children's channels in South Asia.

Bangladesh

India 
The first kids channel which came first in India is Cartoon Network which is launched on May 1, 1995.

Pakistan

Sri Lanka

Programming Blocks

India

Pakistan

References

Lists of television channels
.